The 35th Golden Disc Awards ceremony was held from January 9–10, 2021. The show was aired on JTBC network from South Korea. It  was held without a live audience due to the COVID-19 pandemic. Lee Seung-gi and Park So-dam served as hosts on the first day, Lee Da-hee and Sung Si-kyung on the second.

Criteria
The first part of this two-day award ceremony highlighted the biggest digital releases in 2020. The second part, taking place on January 10, recognized achievements in the category of physical album releases. For judging the awards, music and albums released from November 2019 to November 2020 were considered. Those songs and albums which were excluded from the evaluation due to the judging count deadline in 34th awards were also included in this year's awards.

Winners and nominees
Winners are listed first in alphabetical order and emphasized in bold.

Listing adapted from Golden Disc Awards.

Genre & Other Awards

References

2021 in South Korean music
Golden Disc
Golden Disc Awards ceremonies